Chiring We is the Himalayan  peak situated in eastern Kumaun of the Pithoragarh district of Uttarakhand state in India. The altitude of the peak  is 6,559 m. Chiring We is the highest peak above the Kalabaland Glacier. Chiring We massif, which include peaks like Bamba Dhura (6,334 m), Suli Top (6,300 m), Trigal (5,983 m), Suitilla (6,373 m), separates Lassar Yankti valley from Kalabaland valley. The peak literally means 'Mountain of long life'. The route is through glaciers of Kalabaland, Sankalpa and Yankchar, icefall, crevasses, ice-pinnacles, ice walls and sharp ridges. First ascent to this peak was made in 1979 by an Indian team led by Harish Kapadia via northeast ridge.

Climbing history
On 10 June 1979 'The Mountaineers', A club from Bombay Climbed Chiring We, led by Harish Kapadia. The summiters are Zerksis S. Boga, Lakhpa Tsering, Nayankumar Katira and Kami Tsering. The route taken from Camp 3 to the col between Chiring We and Bamba Dhura. Then on north face to the west ridge, followed to the top. For the final assault About 1500 ft of rope was fixed. This was the last highest unclimbed peak in Kumaon. The team comprising Zerksis Boga (Deputy Leader) and Nayankumar Katira as the lead team. Vijay Kothari and Chandrasinh Danthi, Kanu PomaL, Dr Rodhan Shroff and Dr Vasant Desai, Kali Bordiwala and Rajendra Desai and three sherpas Chewang Tashi, Kami Tsering and Lakhpa Tsering.

Neighboring and subsidiary peaks
Neighboring or subsidiary peaks of Chiring We:
 Bamba Dhura, 6,334m (20,781 ft),  
 Suli Top, 6,300m (20,669 ft), 
 Kalganga Dhura, 6,215m (20,390 ft)
 Kalabaland Dhura, 6,105m (20,030 ft)
 Suitilla, 6,373m (20,909 ft)

Glaciers and rivers
Kalabaland Glacier is 15 km in length, running NW to SE. It joins the Yankchar glacier and both together form the Shankalpa glacier, The Ralam Gad river originates from here which later joins Gori Ganga or Gori gad which originates at Milam Glacier on the west of Kalabaland glacier.

See also

 List of Himalayan peaks of Uttarakhand

References

Mountains of Uttarakhand
Geography of Pithoragarh district
Six-thousanders of the Himalayas